The Schola Cantorum de Paris is a private conservatory in Paris. It was founded in 1894 by Charles Bordes, Alexandre Guilmant and Vincent d'Indy as a counterbalance to the Paris Conservatoire's emphasis on opera.

History
La Schola was founded in 1894 and opened on 15 October 1896 as a rival to the Paris Conservatoire. Alexandre Guilmant, an organist at the Conservatoire, was the director of the Schola before d'Indy took over. D'Indy set the curriculum, which fostered the study of late Baroque and early Classical works, Gregorian chant, and Renaissance polyphony. According to the Oxford Companion to Music, "A solid grounding in technique was encouraged, rather than originality, and the only graduates who could stand comparison with the best Conservatoire students were Magnard, Roussel, Déodat de Séverac, and Pierre de Bréville." The school was originally located in Montparnasse; in 1900 it moved to its present site, a former convent in the Quartier Latin.

Notable teachers
 Isaac Albéniz
 Léon Barzin
 Antoine Geoffroy-Dechaume 
 Wanda Landowska
 Jean Langlais
 Olivier Messiaen
Darius Milhaud
 Albert Roussel

Alumni
In addition to those mentioned above, students, not all full-time, have included:
 Joseph Canteloube
 Helen Eugenia Hagan (African American)
 Cole Porter (for a few months in 1920) (Indiana)
 John Jacob Niles (Kentucky)
 Dulce María Serret
 Erik Satie (as a mature student)
 Joaquin Turina (Spain)
 Edgard Varèse
 Theodor Rogalski (Romania)
Félix Raugel
Anne Terrier Laffaille
 Congyu Wang (Singapore)

Notes

External links
 Schola Cantorum website
 :fr:Schola Cantorum de Paris

Music schools in Paris
Educational institutions established in 1894
1894 establishments in France